Qaravəlli (also, Karavelli) is a village in the Ismailli Rayon of Azerbaijan.

References 

Populated places in Ismayilli District